Maurice (Moe) Levesque (born July 28, 1938) was a Canadian football player who played for the Saskatchewan Roughriders, Montreal Alouettes, and Ottawa Rough Riders. He won the Grey Cup with Saskatchewan in 1966. He previously played football on the Halifax Navy team.

References

1938 births
Canadian football people from Ottawa
Players of Canadian football from Ontario
Montreal Alouettes players
Saskatchewan Roughriders players
Ottawa Rough Riders players
Living people